Pancrase: Yes, We Are Hybrid Wrestlers 1 was the first mixed martial arts event held by Pancrase Hybrid Wrestling. It took place at the Tokyo Bay NK Hall in Urayasu, Chiba, Japan on September 21, 1993. The card featured many future MMA champions.

History 
Pancrase: Yes, We Are Hybrid Wrestlers 1 was the inaugural event of the mixed martial arts promotion Pancrase, which was founded by professional wrestlers Masakatsu Funaki and  Minoru Suzuki in 1993. The background of the formation of the organization took place in the pro wrestling organization Fujiwara Gumi. In 1992, a rare legitimate match was booked where Ken Shamrock (fighting as Wayne Shamrock) faced international kickboxing champion Don Nakaya Nielsen. Shamrock took Nielsen down immediately and submitted him with an arm lock in 45 seconds. The success of this match made young pro wrestlers Shamrock, Masakatsu Funaki and Minoru Suzuki question what they had been told since breaking into predetermined wrestling: that nobody would ever pay to see real matches.

Shamrock, Funaki and Suzuki then spearheaded a group of pro wrestlers and decided to abandon everything people had told them about real matches not being marketable./ They formed a promotion called Pancrase, named by ’60s wrestling star Karl Gotch after the sport of Pankration in the ancient Olympics, which combined all different forms of fighting into one sport. Using pro wrestling rules – no closed fist punching to the face (closed fisted punches were allowed to the body), breaks on the ropes, but fighting for real – Shamrock beat Funaki via choke in 6:15 in the main event of the first of what was billed as an all-shoot match pro wrestling show. The show drew an enthusiastic sellout crowd of 7,000 fans, who did not know what they would be seeing, but when it was over, both the fans and media heavily praised this new form of fighting.

The main event featured Pancrase founder and future King of Pancrase Masakatsu Funaki fighting against future UFC Hall of Famer Ken Shamrock. The fight between Shamrock and Funaki was intriguing because Funaki was Shamrock's teacher and trainer. Shamrock ultimately submitted Funaki with an arm triangle choke. The event also saw victories by future MMA champions Minoru Suzuki, and Bas Rutten who won by a palms strike sending Ryushi Yanigsawa to the canvas in 43 seconds. Kazuo Takahashi and Takaku Fuke also won, with Fuke defeating future King of the Cage Light Heavyweight champion Vernon White

Results

See also 
 Pancrase
 List of Pancrase champions
 List of Pancrase events
 1993 in Pancrase

References

External links
 Official Pancrase Website
 Sherdog.com event results

1993 in mixed martial arts
Mixed martial arts in Japan
Sport in Chiba Prefecture
1993 in Japanese sport
Pancrase events